Shaun David Wane (born 14 September 1964) is an English professional rugby league coach who is the head coach for the England national rugby league team and former professional rugby league footballer

He is a former head coach of the Wigan Warriors, where he won 3 Super League Grand Finals between 2011 and 2018. He is a former professional rugby union coach.

Background
Shaun Wane was born in Wigan, Lancashire, England.

Playing career

1980s
Wane joined Wigan from Wigan St Patricks in 1982 and played 149 matches for the club. He won caps for Great Britain in 1984 and 1985 against France. Wane played in the 14–8 victory over New Zealand at Central Park on 6 October 1985.

Wane played right-, i.e. number 12, in Wigan's 18–26 defeat by St. Helens in the 1984 Lancashire County Cup Final during the 1984–85 season at Central Park, Wigan, on Sunday 28 October 1984, played right-, i.e. number 10, in the 34–8 victory over Warrington in the 1985 Lancashire County Cup Final during the 1985–86 season at Knowsley Road, St. Helens, on Sunday 13 October 1985. He right-, and scored a try in the 18–4 victory over Hull Kingston Rovers in the 1985–86 John Player Special Trophy Final during the 1985–86 season at Elland Road, Leeds on Saturday 11 January 1986.

Wane played in the 8–0 victory over Warrington in the Premiership Final during the 1986–87 season at Old Trafford on 17 May 1987.

Wane helped Wigan to the Championship victory during the 1986–87 season. He won the man of the match in the 8–2 victory over Manly-Warringah Sea Eagles in the 1987 World Club Challenge at Central Park on 7 October 1987.

Wane was an interchange/substitute in the 32–12 victory over Halifax in the 1988 Challenge Cup Final during the 1987–88 season at Wembley on Saturday 30 April 1988.

Wane played right- in the 28–16 victory over Warrington in the 1987 Lancashire County Cup Final during the 1987–88 season at Knowsley Road, St. Helens, on Sunday 11 October 1987.

Wane played right- in the 18–4 victory over Warrington in the 1988–89 John Player Special Trophy Final during the 1988–89 season at Burnden Park, Bolton on Saturday 7 January 1989,

1990s
Wane played as an interchange/substitute, i.e. number 15, (replacing  Ian Lucas on 21 minutes) in the 24–12 victory over Halifax in the 1989–90 John Player Special Trophy Final during the 1989–90 season at Elland Road, Leeds on Saturday 13 January 1990. He featured in Wigan's Championship victory during the 1989–90 season.

In 1990 Wane left Wigan to join Leeds where he spent three seasons. He then joined Workington Town for a season before retiring in 1994.

Coaching career

Wigan Warriors

In 2003, after working as a scout for the club for three years, Wane was appointed as coach for Wigan's under-18 academy side.

On 7 October 2009 Wane was appointed the assistant coach of Wigan working under new coach Michael Maguire, and with player/assistant coach Paul Deacon. He was part of a successful season at Wigan which saw them top the Super League XV table and go on to win the Super League Grand Final with a 22–10 victory over rivals St. Helens. During the season Wane took temporary charge of the first team for Wigan's away victories in July over Hull FC, and Leeds whilst Maguire was on compassionate leave.

In October 2011, Wane was appointed Wigan's head coach, replacing Maguire, who had returned to Australia to coach in the National Rugby League.

On 5 October 2013, Wane coached Wigan to victory in the 2013 Super League Grand Final against Warrington at Old Trafford, thus achieving the double that year after winning the 2013 Challenge Cup Final with victory over Hull F.C. at Wembley Stadium in August.

Wane coached Wigan to the 2015 Super League Grand Final defeat by Leeds at Old Trafford.

Wane also coached Wigan to victory in the 2016 Super League Grand Final at Old Trafford.

Wane coached the Wigan club to the 2017 Challenge Cup Final defeat by Hull F.C. at Wembley Stadium.

Wane departed Wigan after beating Warrington at Old Trafford in the 2018 Super League Grand Final.

Scotland RU
Following his final season with Wigan, Wane was appointed as a High Performance Coach for the Scotland national rugby union team.

England RL

On 3 February 2020, Wane was appointed as England head coach on a two-year deal.

25 June 2021 was his first competitive game coaching England in their 24–26 defeat to the Combined Nations All Stars, staged at the Halliwell Jones Stadium, Warrington, as part of England's 2021 Rugby League World Cup preparation.

In October 2022 Wane named his England squad for the 2021 Rugby League World Cup. He guided England to the semi-final of the 2021 Rugby League World Cup but they fell one game short of the final losing to Samoa 27–26.

Managerial statistics
Source:Updated: 4 March 2022

References

External links

!Great Britain Statistics at englandrl.co.uk (statistics currently missing due to not having appeared for both Great Britain, and England)

Statistics at wigan.rlfans.com
Profile at wiganwarriorsfans.com
Official Website

1964 births
Living people
England national rugby league team coaches
English rugby league coaches
English rugby league players
English rugby union coaches
Great Britain national rugby league team players
Leeds Rhinos players
Rugby league locks
Rugby league props
Rugby league second-rows
Rugby league players from Wigan
Wigan St Patricks players
Wigan Warriors coaches
Wigan Warriors players
Workington Town players